Basco (from the Latin, vascone, meaning "basque") may refer to:

Basco, Batanes, a municipality in the Philippines
Basco, Illinois, a village in the United States
Basco, Wisconsin, an unincorporated community in the United States
Briggs & Stratton, a manufacturing company

People with the name
Alessio Di Basco (born 1964), Italian professional cyclist
Dante Basco (born 1975), American actor
Dion Basco (born 1977), American actor
Ella Jay Basco, American actress
Johnny Geo Basco, (born 1974), Canadian wrestling personality

Surnames of Philippine origin
Surnames of Spanish origin
Ethnonymic surnames